Irene Diaz is a singer-songwriter from Los Angeles.

Career 
In late 2011 Irene Diaz began a career move making her way into the music scene playing at various venues around the Los Angeles area.

In July 2013, Irene Diaz released first EP I Love You Madly by successfully fundraising through Kickstarter. In December 2013, NPR's Alt.Latino referred to Irene Diaz's music as one of Alt.Latino's favorites of 2013 and "She is pretty amazing".

In May 2015, Irene Diaz performed at Pachanga Latino Music Festival, when Alt.Latino referred to Irene Diaz's music as "It's really powerful. It's strong music. It's soft, but quiet storm".

Discography

Singles and EPs 
 I Love You Madly (2013)
 This Cannot Be (2016)

Albums

References

External links 
 Irene Diaz Official Website
 Irene Diaz on facebook
 Irene Diaz on SoundCloud

Living people
American women singer-songwriters
Singers from Los Angeles
Torch singers
Year of birth missing (living people)
Singer-songwriters from California
21st-century American women